Celio Calcagnini (Ferrara, 17 September 1479 – Ferrara, 24 April 1541), also known as Caelius Calcagninus, was an Italian humanist and scientist from Ferrara. His learning as displayed in his collected works is very broad.

He had a wide experience: as soldier, academic, diplomat and in the chancery of Ippolito d'Este. He was consulted by Richard Croke on behalf of Henry VIII of England in the question of the latter's divorce. He was a major influence on Rabelais's literary and linguistic ideas and is presumed to have met him in Italy, as well as being a teacher of Clément Marot and was praised by Erasmus.

Giovanni Battista Giraldi was a student of his, and succeeded him at the University of Ferrara.

He had a contemporary reputation as an astronomer, and wrote on the rotation of the Earth. He knew Copernicus in Ferrara at the beginning of the sixteenth century. His Quod Caelum Stet, Terra Moveatur is a precursor of the De Revolutionibus of Copernicus, though A. C. Crombie qualifies his rotational theory as "vague", and is often dated to about 1525.

Works
 Opera aliquot (1544)

Notes

External links
Online Galleries, History of Science Collections, University of Oklahoma Libraries High resolution images of works by and/or portraits of Celio Calcagnini in .jpg and .tiff format.

1479 births
1541 deaths
Scientists from Ferrara
Italian male writers
16th-century Italian astronomers
Italian Renaissance humanists
Academic staff of the University of Ferrara